The 2014 Kelly Cup Playoffs of the ECHL started following the April 13th conclusion of the 2013–14 ECHL regular season.

Playoff seeds
After the regular season, 16 teams qualified for the playoffs. The Alaska Aces were the Western Conference regular season champions and the Brabham Cup winners with the best record, making them the first team in league history to win the Brabham Cup in four consecutive seasons. The Reading Royals earned the top seed in the Eastern Conference.

Eastern Conference
 Reading Royals
 Kalamazoo Wings
 South Carolina Stingrays
 Orlando Solar Bears
 Cincinnati Cyclones
 Wheeling Nailers
 Greenville Road Warriors
 Fort Wayne Komets

Western Conference
 Alaska Aces
 Ontario Reign
 Utah Grizzlies
 Idaho Steelheads
 Colorado Eagles
 Bakersfield Condors
 Stockton Thunder
 Las Vegas Wranglers

Playoff Brackets

References

See also 
 2013–14 ECHL season
 List of ECHL seasons

Kelly Cup playoffs
2013–14 ECHL season